Aglaomyia is a genus of fungus gnats in the family Mycetophilidae. There are at least two described species in Aglaomyia.

Species
These two species belong to the genus Aglaomyia:
A. gatineau (Vockeroth, 1980)
A. zhejiangensis Wu, 1995

References

Further reading

 

Mycetophilidae
Articles created by Qbugbot
Sciaroidea genera